Francisco Carlos "Frank" Rubio (born December 11, 1975) is a US Army lieutenant colonel and helicopter pilot, flight surgeon, and NASA astronaut.

Early life and education
Francisco Rubio was born on December 11, 1975, in Los Angeles, California, to Salvadoran parents. As a child he lived in El Salvador for the first six years of his life, 
after which his family moved to Miami, Florida, where he attended Miami Sunset Senior High School. He attended the United States Military Academy, and earned a bachelor's degree in international relations.

Military career
After commissioning as a second lieutenant in the US Army, Rubio became a UH-60 Blackhawk pilot. Rubio was a platoon leader in A Company, 2nd Battalion, 82nd Airborne Division, and a company commander for A Company, 2nd Battalion, 3rd Aviation Regiment. As a pilot, Rubio had over 1,100 hours of flying time, including 600 combat hours during operations in Bosnia, Iraq, and Afghanistan.

Rubio received a Doctorate of Medicine from the Uniformed Services University of the Health Sciences, and completed a family medicine residency at Fort Benning. He served as a clinic supervisor and flight surgeon at Redstone Arsenal. At the time of his selection as an astronaut candidate, Rubio was the surgeon for 3rd Battalion, 10th Special Forces Group at Fort Carson.

NASA career
In 2017, Rubio was selected as a member of NASA Astronaut Group 22, and began his two-year training.

On July 15, 2022, NASA announced he will fly on board Soyuz MS-22.

Rubio launched aboard Soyuz MS-22 on September 21, 2022. His mission was planned to last around 6 months with a return to Earth in early 2023. Damage to the spacecraft extended the mission, however, Rubio is now expected to return to Earth with Soyuz MS-23 after around 9 months in space.

Personal life
Rubio and his wife, Deborah, have four children.

Awards and honors
Rubio has received the Bronze Star, Meritorious Service Medal, and Army Achievement Medal. He is a graduate of the US Army Command and General Staff College, and has earned the Senior US Army Aviator, Pathfinder, Air Assault, and the Parachutist badges.

References

1975 births
Living people
People from Los Angeles
American people of Salvadoran descent
United States Military Academy alumni
Military personnel from California
Military personnel from Florida
Helicopter pilots
American Senior Army Aviators
Uniformed Services University of the Health Sciences alumni
United States Army Medical Corps officers
American astronauts
Physician astronauts
United States Army Command and General Staff College alumni
Spacewalkers
Hispanic and Latino American aviators